Primeasia University (also known as PaU) is a private research university located in Dhaka, Bangladesh. It was established in 2003.

History 
Primeasia University (PaU) received Government permission in August 2003. Subsequently, Primeasia (PaU) University started its journey with only 35 students in the fall semester of 2003. Within a short period of time Primeasia University grew up to a significantly large university.

At present, the university has textile engineering, electrical and electronic engineering, computer science and engineering and architecture departments under the School of Engineering; microbiology, pharmacy, biochemistry, public health and nutrition departments under the School of Biological Science; BBA, MBA, international tourism and hospitality management departments under the School of Business Administration and law department under the School of Law. Today, the total number of students of this university is around 4000. All the departments are well equipped with necessary laboratories, libraries and other facilities.

Nazrul Islam, the present chairman of the Board of Trustees of Primeasia University, is the founder of Primeasia University (PaU).  For establishing Primeasia University(PAU) and for bring it up to the present state, the efforts of Mr. M.A. Khaleque is worth mentioning. From the very beginning he has been working very hard to contribute in the growth of this university and also Mr. Md. Raihan Azad, is the present vice chairman of the Board of Trustees of Primeasia University.

Campus 
From the very beginning, the campus of Primeasia University(PAU) has been at Banani, Dhaka. The present campus contains two 16-storied buildings and another six storied building which are adjacent to each other. The buildings are: (i) Star Tower, 12 Kemal Atatürk Avenue, Banani C/A,Dhaka-1213, (ii) HBR Tower 9, Road No # 17, Banani C/A, Dhaka-1213, (iii) GMQ Tower House 11, Road # 17, Block # C, Banani, Dhaka-1213.

This campus serves 4,000 to 5,000 students with amenities and facilities. Total floor space is approximately 1,38,667 square feet. The university authority has been taking necessary steps to build permanent campus at Joarshahara by the side of the 300 feet Purbachal link highway.

Board of Trustees 
Nazrul Islam - Chairman
Mr. Md. Raihan Azad - Vice chairman
 M. A. Wahhab - Member
 N. H. Bulu - Member
 Taslima Islam - Member
 Salim Mahmud - Member
 K. M. Rakib Hossain - Member
 Ayesha Husne Jahan - Member
 Hemayet Ullah - Member
 Rabeya Begum - Member
 Syed Shah Alam Meerza - Member
 Vice Chancellor - Ex-officio Member

Board of Advisors 
 Commodore Jobair Ahmad (E), ndc, BN (Rtd.) - Chief Advisor (Admin)

 Prof. Rebeka Sultana - First Lady of the People's Republic of Bangladesh and Advisor (Academic), Primeasia University 

 Suzadur Rahman - Advisor (Policy & Development)

 Fahim Ahmed - Advisor 

 Dr. Shaikh Eskander - Advisor

 Mohammad Arbaaz Nayeem - Advisor

List of vice-chancellors

List of Treasurer 
 Prof. Dr. Iffat Jahan - Treasurer

List of Registrar 
 Brig Gen Kazi A.S.M Arif,afwc, psc (Retd)- Registrar

Academic Council 
Primeasia University has an Academic Council which has been formed according to the private university ordinance, 2010. The Vice Chancellor is the chairman of the academic council. Other members are Pro- Vice Chancellor, Registrar, the Heads of the Departments, External Members (Educationists), and BoT representatives. Registrar serves as the member secretary of the Academic Council. All academic matters are referred to the Academic Council for Approval and decisions. Primeasia University has four schools that provide fourteen different degree programs. Additionally, it has an institute (proposed) to offer certificates and diplomas in different languages. The programs are also accredited by the Institution of Engineers, Bangladesh (IEB), the Pharmacy Council of Bangladesh (PCB), and the Bangladesh Bar Council.

Academic programs and degree programs 
The university has four schools and 12 departments under those schools.

School of Engineering 
1. Textile Engineering Department
 B.Sc. in Textile engineering
2. Electrical & Electronic Engineering Department
 B.Sc. in Electrical and Electronice Engineering (EEE)
 B.Sc. in Electronics and telecom engineering (ETE)
3. Computer Science & Engineering Department
 B.Sc. in Computer science and engineering (CSE)
 B.Sc. in Computer science and information technology (CSIT)
4. Architecture Engineering Department
 Bachelor of Architecture (B. Arch.)

School of Biological Science 
5. Microbiology Department
 B.sc. (Hons.) in microbiology
 M.sc. in microbiology
6. Biochemistry Department
 B.sc. (Hons.) in biochemistry
7. Public Health & Nutrition Department
 B.sc. (Hons.) in public health and nutrition
8. Pharmacy Department
 B.Pharm. (Hons.)
 M.Pharm. (accredited by Pharmacy Council of Bangladesh)

School of Business 
9. Business Administration Department
 Bachelor of Business Administration (major: accounting, marketing, finance, HRM, and bank management)
10. International Tourism and Hospitality Management Department
 Bachelor of  International Tourism and Hospitality Management
11. Master of Business Administration Department
 Master of Business Administration (major: accounting, marketing, finance, HRM, and bank management)
 MBA in textile & apparel marketing
 MBA Executive

School of Law 
12. Law Department
 4-Year LL.B (Hons.)

Supporting departments 
 Physics Department
 Chemistry Department
 English Department
 Humanities Department

Semesters 
The academic year of the university incorporates three regular semesters: spring, summer and fall. The duration of each semester is four months.
 Spring semester: January to May
 Summer semester: May to September
 Fall semester: September to January

Facilities and services 
Tuition waiver and scholarship are provided for meritorious and poor students.  The university has laboratories for Textile Engineering, Electrical & Electronic Engineering, Computer Science &Engineering, Microbiology, Pharmacy, Biochemistry and Public Health Nutrition.

University Management System (UMS) 
Software Engineering Section of the university has developed a web based University Management System (UMS) under the supervision and guidance of Pro Vice Chancellor. The UMS system has started functioning with the students of summer 2014. Continuous development, expansion, modification addition of the UMS has been going on. The present system can be used by the teachers as well as the students through the internet.

Library 
The Primeasia University central library consists of a Reference Section and a General Section located at two floors with over 7,500 square feet floor area at HBR tower.  The library function catalogue services are now available through a library management software (KOHA)

The library can accommodate around 300 students. The library remains open for 9:00 am –8:00 pm. Students can use the library during the library hours. There is a separate space for the teachers in the reference section.  There are also PCs with Internet connectivity inside the library.

The library has adequate books and other publications. It subscribes to local and some international journals and magazines. The library subscribes to INASPIRI for  e-journals and limited number of e-books.

Laboratories 
The departments of Primeasia University has rich laboratory facilities. These are:

Textile Engineering Department laboratories 
 Physics Laboratory
 Chemistry Laboratory
 Computer (Programming & Networking) Laboratory
 Textile Testing & Quality Control
 Weaving (with prototype mill machinery) Laboratory
 Knitting (with prototype mill machinery) Laboratory
 Spinning (with prototype mill machinery) Laboratory
 Fabric Structure and Design Laboratory
 Wet Processing Laboratory - I Laboratory
 Wet Processing Laboratory - II Laboratory
 Apparel (Pattern & Design with CAD & Plotter) Laboratory
 Apparel (Cutting & Sewing with CAM) Laboratory
 Clothing Comfort Assessment Laboratory
 Engineering Drawing Laboratory
 Mechanical Engineering & Workshop Practice Laboratory
 Industrial Production Engineering Laboratory

Pharmacy Department laboratories 
 Pharmacognosy & Phytochemistry Laboratory
 Pharmaceutical Microbiology Laboratory
 Medicinal Chemistry & Organic Pharmacy Laboratory
 Physical Pharmacy & Inorganic Pharmacy Laboratory
 Physiology & Pharmacology Laboratory
 Pharmaceutics & Biopharmaceutics Laboratory
 Pharmaceutical Technology Laboratory

Advanced laboratories for research 
 Advanced Instrumental Research Laboratory
 Advanced Biopharmaceutics & Bioequivalence Research Laboratory
 Advanced Biotechnology Research Laboratory
 Advanced Phytochemistry and Pharmaceutics Laboratory

Electrical & Electronic Engineering Department laboratories 
 Electrical Circuits Laboratory (AC/DC)
 Analogue Electronics Laboratory
 Computer Laboratory
 Communication Laboratory
 Control Engineering Laboratory
 Electrical Machines Laboratory
 VLSI  Laboratory
 Microwave Engineering Laboratory
 Microprocessor and Interfacing Laboratory

Computer Science and Engineering Department laboratories 
The Computer laboratory contains Intel core i5 PCs with necessary software.

Undergraduate students of Computer Science and Engineering Department use the following Laboratories:
 Microcontroller Laboratory: Department has microcontroller kits and ATMEL AVR simulators for microcontrollers for performing experiment on robots, traffic controller, digital display, motor control
 Hardware Laboratory:  Performed at EEE department circuit and electronics (analog and digital ) labs
 Networking Laboratory experiments are performed using software like PacketTracer, NS2 and Omnet++
 Database Design Laboratory: Performed in Oracle Express, Oracle 11g, MySQL

Convocations

First convocation 
The first Convocation of the university was held on Sunday, 4 April 2010 at the Bangabandhu International Conference Center (BICC) with a total of 515 students both graduate (173) and undergraduate (342), and were awarded degrees during this convocation.

Honorable President of the People's of Bangladesh & Chancellor of Primeasia University, Mr. Md. Zillur Rahman attended the Convocation ceremony as Chief Guest and conferred degrees to the students.

Hafiz G.A. Siddiqi, The then Vice Chancellor of North South University attended the ceremony as Convocation Speaker. Mr. Nurul Islam Nahid, Honorable Minister of Education, Chairman of UGC, chairman, Vice Chairman & Members of the Board of Governors of Primeasia Foundation and other distinguished guests attended the Convocation ceremony.

Second convocation 
The second Convocation of the university was held at the Bangabandhu International Conference Center (BICC) on Tuesday, 5 February 2013. 74 graduate and 570 undergraduate students were awarded degrees in this convocation. With the approval of the Honorable President and Chancellor of the university, Mr. Nurul Islam Nahid, MP, Hon'ble Minister, Ministry of Education presided over the Convocation ceremony as the Chief Guest and conferred degrees to the students.

Pabitra Sarker, former Vice Chancellor, Rabindra Bharati University graced the occasion as the Convocation Speaker. Chairman, Vice Chairmen & Members of the Board of Trustees of Primeasia University and other distinguished guests attended the Convocation ceremony.

Academic curricula 
Course curriculum for each degree program meets national and international standards.  Every department has a Syllabus Committee comprising two experts from outside and all faculty members of the department.

References

Architecture schools in Bangladesh
Universities and colleges in Dhaka
Educational institutions established in 2003
Private universities in Bangladesh
Architecture in Bangladesh
2003 establishments in Bangladesh